John Richard Painter (11 November 1856 – 16 September 1900) was an English cricketer who played professionally for Gloucestershire, South, Lord Sheffield's XI and an England XI.

Playing career
Painter began his professional career with Lancashire club Clitheroe before joining Gloucestershire in 1881. Between 1881 and 1897 he played 192 matches for the county. In August 1894, the match played at Clifton College Close Ground between Gloucestershire and Middlesex was awarded to him as a benefit.

Later life
In 1895, he opened a cricket and athletic store in Clifton, Bristol. When he died in 1900 at the age of 43, he left a widow and two children.

References

1856 births
1900 deaths
English cricketers
English cricketers of 1864 to 1889
English cricketers of 1890 to 1918
Gloucestershire cricketers
People from Bourton-on-the-Water
North v South cricketers
Sportspeople from Gloucestershire